"D.O.A. (Death of Auto-Tune)" is a song written by American rapper Jay-Z. It was produced by No I.D. The song was released as a digital download on June 23, 2009, and as the first single from Jay-Z's 11th studio album, The Blueprint 3. The song made its world premiere on the New York radio station Hot 97 on June 5. Its lyrics address the overusage of Auto-Tune in the music industry. The song samples "In the Space" by French composer Janko Nilović. The bridge is inspired by Steam's "Na Na Hey Hey Kiss Him Goodbye" and interpolates lyrics from Kanye West's "Big Brother", and "You're Nobody (Till Somebody Kills You)" by The Notorious B.I.G. The song won Jay-Z his eighth Grammy Award, and his second for Best Rap Solo Performance. It peaked at No. 24 on Billboard Hot 100.

Writing and inspiration
Before making "D.O.A. (Death of Auto-Tune)", Kanye West and Jay-Z had recorded an Auto-Tune song. However, Kanye heard the instrumental by No I.D. and thought about making an anti-Auto-Tune song. They then removed all the songs that contained Auto-Tune from The Blueprint 3 to further their point. Jay-Z himself stated that the point of the song was to "draw a line in the sand", saying that while he appreciated the use of the Auto-Tune by artists with an ear for melody like T-Pain and Kanye West, far too many people had jumped onto the technology and were using it as a crutch. One of the partial inspirations for Jay-Z to write the song was hearing Auto-Tune being used in an advertisement for Wendy's fast-food chain. It made him feel that what was once a trend had become a gimmick. The title is also a reference to the medical term "D.O.A." or "Dead on Arrival". The song makes a reference to The Notorious B.I.G. song "You're Nobody ('Till Somebody Kills You)". Jay-Z sampled a portion of The Notorious B.I.G.'s freestyle "Wake Up Show Freestyle".

Music video
On June 27, 2009, a trailer for the video was released. The music video (directed by Anthony Mandler) was shot and aired immediately after the 2009 BET Awards on June 28.The video shows Jay in scenes such as a deserted factory building, a bar with a band, and playing card games in a kitchen. Actor Harvey Keitel cameos in the video as a card player in the kitchen of New York's exclusive restaurant, Rao's. Basketball player LeBron James also makes a cameo appearance. 

The video was nominated for Best Male Video and Best Hip-Hop Video at the 2009 MTV Video Music Awards. It did not win either of the categories, losing to T.I.'s "Live Your Life" and Eminem's "We Made You" respectively.

The video ranked at #17 on BET's Notarized: Top 100 Videos of 2009 countdown.

Responses
On June 9, R&B artist Trey Songz released an unofficial remix of the song on his blog. Renamed "Death of Autotune Kellz", it was directed at artist R. Kelly for using the effect on a previous mixtape. Rappers AZ and Jay Rock have also both recorded remixes. Royce da 5'9" has released two remixes of it, one by himself and one with fellow Slaughterhouse members Joe Budden, Crooked I, and Joell Ortiz. Singer Avery Storm has also made a remix using the songs instrumental supporting the death of auto-tune. Bone Thugs-N-Harmony have also made a remix to the song featuring all five members. Rapper The Game released a diss track in response to the song entitled "I'm So Wavy (Death of Hov)", going at Jay-Z for what Game perceives as him being behind the times in the hip-hop industry, and his stance that Jay-Z being 39 years old means he's too old to stay in the music scene, evidenced with lyrics such as "D.O.A.? No. T-Pain stays, old nigga goes." DJ Webstar was also critical of Jay-Z for the track in an interview with RealTalkNY, saying:

In an October interview with Tim Westwood, Lil Wayne also criticized the track, throwing support toward T-Pain as a known user of it:

On August 31, 2009, the music group, Bone Thugs-n-Harmony recorded a remix of the song. It was released officially on their MySpace page. The song includes the 5 united members singing separate verses along with Jay-Z singing the original chorus.  The song has also been remixed by rappers such as Lil Wayne and Asher Roth.

The song was ranked best song of the year 2009 by MTV.

Time magazine ranked it number 8 on their list of the best songs of 2009.

Live performances
Two days after the song premiered on Hot 97, Jay-Z made an appearance at the annual Summer Jam concert at Giants Stadium and performed the song live for the first time. Towards the end of his set, he was surprised by the appearance of T-Pain who joined him onstage. He later performed "D.O.A. (Death of Auto-Tune)" during the 2009 BET Awards.

Charts
The song made a "Hot Shot Debut"  at #24 on the Billboard Hot 100 based on downloads. It has also reached the top 50 of the Hot R&B/Hip-Hop Songs, peaking at #43.

- * No official release; charted due to downloads only

References

External links
  
 Jay-Z interview by Pete Lewis,'Blues & Soul' December 1998
 

2009 singles
Grammy Award for Best Rap Solo Performance
Jay-Z songs
Music videos directed by Anthony Mandler
Song recordings produced by No I.D.
Songs written by Jay-Z
Roc Nation singles
2009 songs